Spectrometry  may refer to:
 Optical spectrometry, a technique for measuring the distribution of light across the optical spectrum, from the ultraviolet spectral region to the visible and infrared
 Ion-mobility spectrometry, an analytical technique used to separate and identify ionized molecules in the gas phase based on their ion mobility in a carrier buffer gas
 Mass spectrometry, an analytical technique that measures the mass-to-charge ratio of charged particles
 Rutherford backscattering spectrometry, an analytical technique used to determine the structure and composition of materials by measuring the back-scattering of a beam of high energy ions impinging on a sample
 Neutron triple-axis spectrometry, a technique used in inelastic neutron scattering

See also
 Spectrometer
 Spectrophotometry
 Spectroscopy